Nala Ankar Bridge is a road bridge in Chakwal District in the north-west of Pakistan's Punjab Province.

History 
It was built during the government of General Musharaf and Chief Minister of the Punjab Ch. Parvez Elahi.

This bridge was developed due to public protests against accidents on The Nala Ankar turn.

References 

Bridges in Pakistan
Buildings and structures in Punjab, Pakistan
Transport in Punjab, Pakistan
Chakwal District